The men's doubles tournament of the 2018 BWF World Championships (World Badminton Championships) took place from 30 July to 5 August.

Seeds

The seeding list is based on the World Rankings from 12 July 2018.

  Marcus Fernaldi Gideon / Kevin Sanjaya Sukamuljo (quarterfinals)
  Liu Cheng / Zhang Nan (semifinals)
  Mathias Boe / Carsten Mogensen (third round)
  Li Junhui / Liu Yuchen (champions)
  Takeshi Kamura / Keigo Sonoda (final)
  Mads Conrad-Petersen / Mads Pieler Kolding (quarterfinals)
  Takuto Inoue / Yuki Kaneko (quarterfinals)
  Kim Astrup / Anders Skaarup Rasmussen (third round)

  Fajar Alfian / Muhammad Rian Ardianto (third round)
  Vladimir Ivanov / Ivan Sozonov (third round)
  Liao Min-chun / Su Ching-heng (third round)
  Lee Jhe-huei / Lee Yang (second round)
  Goh V Shem / Tan Wee Kiong (third round)
  Chen Hung-ling / Wang Chi-lin (semifinals)
  Berry Angriawan / Hardianto (third round)
  Hiroyuki Endo / Yuta Watanabe (third round)

Draw

Finals

Top half

Section 1

Section 2

Bottom half

Section 3

Section 4

References

External links
Draw

2018 BWF World Championships